These are the sports broadcasting contracts in the Philippines. There are four primary local producers of sport programs in the country: Solar Sports, TAP Sports, GMA Network, and TV5/Cignal TV (One Sports).

Local sports

Basketball
PBA: One Sports (TV5, One Sports; free TV), PBA Rush (cable)
PBA D-League:  One Sports (One Sports; free TV),  PBA Rush (cable)
PCCL: TBD
Filoil Flying V Preseason Cup:  One Sports (One Sports; free TV),
UAAP: One Sports (One Sports; free TV), One Sports+, UAAP Varsity Channel (cable and satellite)
NCAA: GMA Network (free TV)
Maharlika Pilipinas Basketball League: One PH (free TV), One Sports+ (cable), Facebook (free-streaming), YouTube (free-streaming), Kumu (free-streaming) 
Chooks-to-Go Pilipinas 3x3: Facebook (free-streaming)
National Basketball League (Philippines), Women's National Basketball League (Philippines): Solar Sports (cable)
Filbasket: Solar Sports (cable)
VisMin Super Cup: Solar Sports (cable)
Pilipinas Super League: Net 25 (free TV), Solar Sports (cable), YouTube (free-streaming) 
CESAFI: myTV Cebu (cable)

Baseball
UAAP: TBD

Boxing

Blow by Blow (with MP Promotions): One Sports (free TV)

Football (soccer)

UAAP: UAAP Varsity Channel (cable and satellite)
Philippines national football team and Philippines women's national football team matches: One Sports
Philippines Football League: 1Play Sports (streaming via Facebook/YouTube), EXPTV (cable)
Copa Paulino Alcantara: Facebook (free streaming)

Horse racing

Santa Ana races: Apollo Technologies Facebook live streaming
San Lazaro races: San Lazaro Broadcasting Network, Gametime TV our Facebook live streaming
MetroTurf races: Sistemas Enterprises, Inc.

Volleyball

Premier Volleyball League: One Sports (free TV), One Sports+ (cable), Smart Gigafest and PVL.ph (streaming), Kumu (free-streaming) 
Spikers' Turf: One Sports (free TV), One Sports+ (cable) 
V-League:  CNN Philippines (free TV), Facebook (free-streaming)
Shakey's Super League: IBC (free TV), Solar Sports (cable), Plus Network (streaming)
UAAP: One Sports (free TV), One Sports+, UAAP Varsity Channel (cable and satellite)
NCAA: GMA Network (GTV) (free TV)

Rugby

 Matches of the Philippine Volcanoes: Solar Sports

Cheerleading

National Cheerleading Championship: ESPN5 production on TV5 and One Sports (highlights of regional qualifiers and national finals)

eSports
Electronic Sports and Gaming Summit: One Sports (free TV), GG Network (streaming)
The Nationals: eGG Network (cable), One Sports production for One Sports (free TV), GG Network (streaming)
MPL Philippines: Net 25 (free TV), YouTube (free-streaming)

Other

Philippine-American Football League: Solar Sports (cable)
Manila Wrestling Federation
MWF Aksyonovela TV and special events: YouTube (free-streaming)
Cockfighting: SLTV (cable), Pitmasters Live (direct-to-satellite via OTB branches, streaming)

Foreign sports

American football

NFL: Premier Sports
Super Bowl: Premier Sports
NCAA-Division I FBS: One Sports (free TV), Eurosport (selected events)

Auto racing

Formula One: beIN Sports (live races)
Formula Two: beIN Sports (live races)
Formula Three: beIN Sports (live races)
Porsche Supercup: beIN Sports (live races)
IndyCar Series and Indianapolis 500: One Sports (free TV; Indianapolis 500 only) and TAP Sports (cable and free-streaming)
NASCAR Cup Series, Xfinity Series and Gander RV & Outdoors Truck Series: YouTube (delayed free-streaming after US telecast)
FIA World Touring Car Championship: Eurosport (live races)
World Rally Championship: N/A
MotoGP: SPOTV
Supercars: beIN Sports (live races)
Formula E: SPOTV (live races)
Super GT: YouTube (live and on demand)
Deutsche Tourenwagen Masters: YouTube (free practice session), DTM Grid (live races), beIN Sports (highlights)
Motocross World Championship: TBD
International Motor Sports Association: YouTube (delayed free-streaming after US telecast), IMSA.TV (live)
FIA World Rallycross Championship: TAP Sports
ADAC GT Masters: YouTube (live qualify and races)

Baseball

Major League Baseball: Youtube (free-streaming MLB Game of the Week), MLB.TV (online only), ESPN Australia (in select regional cable services)
Australian Baseball League: YouTube (free-streaming)
World Baseball Classic: SPOTV (cable live broadcasts) and Youtube (free-streaming)
Korea Baseball Organization: SPOTV
Chinese Professional Baseball League: Twitter Video and Periscope (live streaming of select English-language broadcasts, since 2020)
Cuban National Series: YouTube (live free-streaming since 2020 via Game Time Sports platform of the World Baseball Softball Confederation)
Dominican Professional Baseball League:  MLB.TV (online only) 
Panamanian Professional Baseball League: YouTube (live free-streaming courtesy of Sertv beginning 2021 season)
Nicaraguan Professional Baseball League: YouTube (free-streaming)
Colombian Professional Baseball League: YouTube (live free-streaming via official league Youtube page beginning 2021 season)
Roberto Clemente Baseball League: Youtube, Facebook and Twitter (free-streaming)

Basketball
Solar formerly held the rights to the National Basketball Association until September 30, 2019, when its contract with the league expired, shutting down cable channels Basketball TV and NBA Premium TV; the expiration of Solar's NBA contract ended ABS-CBN's free-to-air broadcast rights to air NBA games, which is also from them and also ended Fox Sports' coverage of the NBA.

NBA announced on July 27, 2020, that it has signed a multi-year partnership with Cignal TV and Smart Communications to bring NBA games and programming to fans in the Philippines through free-to-air, satellite television and over-the-top streaming. Starting July 31, to coincide with the 2019–20 NBA season restart, free-to-air channels TV5 and ONE Sports will broadcast live NBA games for the first time, including four games every week. Cignal TV, on the other hand, launched an NBA-dedicated channel via NBA TV Philippines, which broadcasts live NBA games 7 days a week (including Finals).

NBA: One Sports (free TV, Monday and Friday), TV5 (free TV, weekends), NBA TV Philippines (cable, 24 hours), NBA League Pass (pay-streaming)
WNBA: NBA TV Philippines (cable, 24 hours)
NCAA Men's Division I: One Sports
McDonald's All-American Game: One Sports
EuroLeague: EuroLeague TV (pay-streaming) and TAP Sports (cable, free-streaming)
EuroCup: EuroLeague TV (pay-streaming)
FIBA national team tournaments: TV5, One Sports (free TV), One Sports+ (cable)
FIBA Intercontinental Cup: Facebook, YouTube, and Twitch (free-streaming)
ASEAN Basketball League: YouTube (free-streaming) 
NBL Australia: Setanta Sports (streaming)
B.League Japan: TBD

Boxing 

 Top Rank* bouts: One Sports (free TV), FITE TV (pay-streaming)
 Premier Boxing Champions: 
 Manny Pacquiao bouts (with ALV Events International): TV5, GMA (free TV, slightly delayed), Sky, Cignal and G Sat (pay-per-view), Radio GMA (radio), TAP Go, UPSTREAM.ph and FITE TV (pay-streaming)
 Golden Boy bouts: DAZN (streaming), Sky and Cignal (pay-per-view), FITE TV (pay-streaming), TAP Sports (cable)
 Matchroom bouts: DAZN (streaming), TAP Sports (cable)
 Superbouts: TAP Sports (cable)
 World Class Boxing bouts (with Golden Boy Promotions): TV5, One Sports (free TV), Solar Sports (cable)
 World Boxing Super Series: TBA
 Dream Boxing: DAZN:October 2022 to October 2025, all fights

(*) Even though Pacquiao is under Top Rank, his bouts are aired on GMA and Solar Sports due to his status as a GMA contract artist and under airtime contract with Solar Entertainment Corporation until 2016.

eSports
Arena eSports: TAP Sports
ELEAGUE: TAP Sports
eGG Network
 GINX Esports TV
Techstorm TV
Mobile Legends: Bang Bang Southeast Asia Cup: Solar Sports

Football

Soccer 

FIFA World Cup: TAP Sports/Premier Sports (cable, pay-streaming), UEFA.tv (free-streaming for UEFA qualifiers), and GMA Network (free-streaming for AFC qualifiers from third round)
FIFA Women's World Cup: TV5/Cignal TV (One Sports) (from 2023)
FIFA U-20 World Cup: TV5/Cignal TV (One Sports) (from 2023)
FIFA U-17 World Cup: TAP Sports/Premier Football (from 2023)
AFF Championship: GMA Network (from 2024)
AFC Asian Cup: GMA Network (from 2023)
AFC Champions League: GMA Network (from 2023-24)
AFC Cup: GMA Network (from 2023-24)
A-League Men: beIN Sports (cable)
Australia Cup: beIN Sports (cable)
A-League Women: beIN Sports (cable)
Chinese Super League: TAP Sports/Premier Football (cable, pay-streaming)
J.League: TV5/Cignal TV (One Sports)
K-League: TAP Sports/Premier Football (cable, pay-streaming)
UEFA European Championship: TAP Sports/Premier Football (cable, pay-streaming)
UEFA European Qualifiers: TAP Sports/Premier Football (cable, pay-streaming)
UEFA Nations League: TAP Sports/Premier Football (cable, pay-streaming)
UEFA European Under-21 Championship: UEFA.tv (free-streaming)
UEFA Boys and Girls Youth Championships (U-17 and U-19): UEFA.tv (free-streaming)
UEFA Champions League: TV5/Cignal TV (One Sports)
UEFA Europa League: TV5/Cignal TV (One Sports)
UEFA Europa Conference League: TAP Sports/Premier Sports (cable, pay-streaming)
UEFA Super Cup: TAP Sports/Premier Sports (cable, pay-streaming)
UEFA Youth League: DAZN
UEFA Women's Champions League: DAZN (2021-2025)
Premier League: Setanta Sports and GMA Network
FA Cup: beIN Sports (cable)
FA Community Shield: beIN Sports (cable)
Scottish Professional Football League: Setanta Sports (pay-streaming)
La Liga: beIN Sports (cable)
Serie A: beIN Sports (cable)
Coppa Italia: TV5/Cignal TV (One Sports)
Supercoppa Italiana: TV5/Cignal TV (One Sports)
Ligue 1: beIN Sports and TV5 Monde Asie (cable)
Coupe de France: DAZN
Trophée des Champions: beIN Sports (cable)
Bundesliga: TAP Sports/Premier Football (cable, pay-streaming)
DFB-Pokal: TAP Sports/Premier Football (cable, pay-streaming)
Eredivisie: TAP Sports/Premier Football (cable, pay-streaming)
Ekstraklasa: OneFootball
Danish Super League: OneFootball (free-streaming)
DBU Pokalen: Eleven Sports (free-streaming)
CONCACAF Gold Cup: beIN Sports (cable)
Major League Soccer: Apple TV+ (pay-streaming via MLS Season Pass)
Canadian Premier League: TAP Sports/Premier Football (cable, pay-streaming)
Saudi Professional League: OneFootball and GMA Network

Futsal 

 UEFA Futsal Champions League: UEFA.tv (free-streaming) (final four only)

Golf 
PGA Tour: Premier Sports, CNBC Asia and GolfTV (pay-streaming)
PGA Champions Tour: Premier Sports
European Tour: One Sports, SPOTV
Asian Tour: One Sports, SPOTV
World Golf Championships: GolfTV (pay-streaming)
Masters Tournament: SPOTV
USGA: One Sports 
Presidents Cup: One Sports+ (cable), One Sports (free TV; delayed)
Ryder Cup: One Sports, Premier Sports (cable)

Hockey

Field 

 FIH
 Men's and Women's Pro Leagues: beIN Sports

Ice 
National Hockey League: NHL.TV (pay streaming), ESPN Australia (in select regional cable services via NHL on ESPN)
International Ice Hockey Federation events: Solar Sports (selected events)

Kickboxing
 King of Kings: DAZN:October 2022 to October 2025, all fights

Mixed martial arts
Bellator MMA: Kix, Paramount Network Asia
Bushido MMA: DAZN:October 2022 to October 2025, all fights
Cage Warriors: Premier Sports (cable)
Enfusion: TAP Sports (cable)
ONE Championship: One Sports (free TV), One Sports+
Professional Fighters League: TAP Sports (cable)
Ultimate Fighting Championship: Premier Sports (cable), UFC Fight Pass (streaming), One Sports (free TV; UFC Fight Night events)

Rugby union
Rugby World Cup: TBD (2023)
Asia Rugby Championship: Asiarugby.tv (free-streaming)
Six Nations Championship: Premier Sports (cable, pay-streaming)
EPCR: Premier Sports (cable, pay-streaming)
Heineken Champions Cup
European Rugby Challenge Cup
World Rugby Sevens Series: Worldrugby.tv (free-streaming), Premier Sports (cable)
Aviva Premiership: Premier Sports (pay-streaming)
International rugby events: Rugby Pass (cable, pay-streaming)

Tennis
 ATP: beIN Sports
 WTA: Premier Sports 2 (cable and streaming)
 Australian Open: beIN Sports
 French Open: beIN Sports
 Wimbledon Championships: SPOTV
 U.S. Open: SPOTV
 Other tennis tournaments: beIN Sports, One Sports, Solar Sports and Eurosport

Professional wrestling
 WWE
WWE Raw: One Sports (free-to-air; 1-hour version); TAP Sports (cable)
WWE SmackDown: One Sports (free-to-air; 1-hour version); One Sports+ (satellite/cable)
WWE NXT: TAP Sports (cable); WWE Network (pay-streaming)
WWE NXT UK: TAP Sports (cable); WWE Network (pay-streaming)
 205 Live and monthly pay-per-view events: WWE Network (pay-streaming)
 Impact Wrestling
Impact!: TAP Sports (cable); FITE TV (pay-streaming)
 Pay-per-view events: FITE TV (pay-streaming)
 All Elite Wrestling
AEW Dynamite: Premier Sports (cable); FITE TV (pay-streaming)
AEW Rampage: Premier Sports (cable); FITE TV (pay-streaming)
 Pay-per-view events: FITE TV (pay-streaming)
 Ring of Honor: FITE TV (pay-streaming)
 New Japan Pro-Wrestling: FITE TV (pay-streaming)

Volleyball
 FIVB
 FIVB Volleyball Nations League: Premier Sports (cable)

Other sports
 Aquatics: One Sports (U.S. NCAA swimming events), Solar Sports (FINA Swimming WC, Diving GP/WS and Water Polo League), Eurosport (European Swimming Championships), beIN Sports (International Swimming League)
 Athletics: Premier Sports 2 and Eurosport (Diamond League)
 Cricket: YouTube (free) (Caribbean Premier League) and DD National (selected events) (cable and online streaming)
 Gymnastics: One Sports (U.S. NCAA gymnastics events)
 Darts:  Solar Sports, Eurosport (selected events)
 Badminton: SPOTV (BWF), One Sports (Badminton Asia)
 Bull riding: TBD
 Australian rules football: ABC Australia (events of the Australian Football League)

Major events
 2020 Summer Olympics, 2024 Summer Olympics: TV5, One Sports, One Sports+ (cable), Cignal (cable; both freeview and pay-per-view), beIN Sports (cable), Olympic Channel (free-streaming), Smart Gigafest (free/premium streaming; 16 channels)
 2020 Paralympic Games: TAP Sports (cable), TAP Go (pay-streaming)
Asian Games: TV5/Cignal TV (One Sports) (2022)
Southeast Asian Games: TV5/Cignal TV (One Sports) (2023)

References

Philippines
Television in the Philippines